The Fatih Mosque is a Cultural Monument of Albania, located in Durrës. It was built in 1502, the year after the Turkish conquest of the city, and named for the Ottoman Sultan Mehmed the Conqueror, (Sulltan Mehmet Fatihu). Closed by the Communist authorities under Enver Hoxha, the mosque became a cultural monument in 1973. Its minaret was torn down but rebuilt in a simpler style after the Communist dictatorship ended.

See also
 Islam in Albania

References

Cultural Monuments of Albania
Mosques in Albania
Buildings and structures in Durrës
Ottoman architecture in Albania
Mosques completed in 1502
1502 establishments in the Ottoman Empire
Tourist attractions in Durrës County